The English term Jew originates in the Biblical Hebrew word Yehudi, meaning "from the Kingdom of Judah". It passed into Greek as Ioudaios and Latin as Iudaeus, which evolved into the Old French giu after the letter "d" was dropped. A variety of related forms are found in early English from about the year 1000, including Iudea, Gyu, Giu, Iuu, Iuw, and Iew, which eventually developed into the modern word.

Etymology

Yehudi in the Hebrew Bible 
According to the Book of Genesis, Judah (Yehudah) was the name of the fourth son of the patriarch Jacob. During the Exodus, the name was given to the Tribe of Judah, descended from the patriarch Judah. After the conquest and settlement of the land of Canaan, Judah also referred to the territory allocated to the tribe. After the splitting of the united Kingdom of Israel, the name was used for the southern kingdom of Judah. The kingdom now encompassed the tribes of Judah, Benjamin and Simeon, along with some of the cities of the Levites. With the destruction of the northern kingdom of Israel (Samaria), the kingdom of Judah became the sole Jewish state and the term y'hudi was applied to all Israelites.

The term Yehudi occurs 74 times in the Masoretic text of the Hebrew Bible. In , the name "Yehudi" has a generic aspect, in this case referring to a man from the tribe of Benjamin:

"There was a man a Yehudi (Jewish man) in Shushan the capital, whose name was Mordecai the son of Jair the son of Shimei the son of Kish, a Benjamite; who had been exiled from Jerusalem with the exile that was exiled with Jeconiah, king of Judah, which Nebuchadnezzar, king of Babylon, had exiled."

"Many of the people of the land became Yehudim (in the generic sense) (mityahadim) because the fear of the Yehudim fell on them."

In some places in the Talmud the word Israel(ite) refers to somebody who is Jewish but does not necessarily practice Judaism as a religion: "An Israel(ite) even though he has sinned is still an Israel(ite)" (Tractate Sanhedrin 44a). More commonly the Talmud uses the term Bnei Yisrael, i.e. "Children of Israel", ("Israel" being the name of the third patriarch Jacob, father of the sons that would form the twelve tribes of Israel, which he was given and took after wrestling with an angel, see Genesis 32:28-29) to refer to Jews. According to the Talmud then, there is no distinction between "religious Jews" and "secular Jews."

In modern Hebrew, the same word is still used to mean both Jews and Judeans ("of Judea"). In Arabic the terms are yahūdī (sg.), al-yahūd (pl.), and بَنُو اِسرَائِيل banū isrāʼīl.

Development in European languages 

The Septuagint (reputedly a product of Hellenistic Jewish scholarship) and other Greek documents translated , Yehudi and the Aramaic  using the Koine Greek term Ioudaios (pl.  Ioudaioi), which had lost the 'h' sound. The Latin term, following the Greek version, is Iudaeus, and from these sources the term passed to other European languages. The Old French giu, earlier juieu, had elided (dropped) the letter "d" from the Latin Iudaeus. The Middle English word Jew derives from Old English where the word is attested as early as 1000 in various forms, such as Iudeas, Gyu, Giu, Iuu, Iuw, Iew. The Old English name is derived from Old French. The modern French term is "Juif/Juive" (m/f).

Most European languages have retained the letter "d" in the word for "Jew". Etymological equivalents are in use in other languages, e.g. Jude in German, judeu in Portuguese, jøde in Danish and Norwegian, judío in Spanish, jood in Dutch. In some languages, derivations of the word "Hebrew" are also in use to describe a Jew, e.g., Ebreo in Italian and Spanish, Ebri / Ebrani in Persian and Еврей Yevrey in Russian. (See List of Jewish ethnonyms for a full overview.) The German word Jude is cognate with the Yiddish word for "Jew", Yid.

Modern use 

In modern English and other contemporary languages, the term "Israelite" was used to refer to contemporary Jews as well as to Jews of antiquity until the mid-20th-century. Since the foundation of the State of Israel, it has become less common to use "Israelite" of Jews in general. Instead, citizens of the state of Israel, whether Jewish or not, are called "Israeli", while "Jew" is used as an ethno-religious designation.

Perception of offensiveness 

The word Jew has been used often enough in a disparaging manner by antisemites that in the late 19th and early 20th centuries it was frequently avoided altogether, and the term Hebrew was substituted instead (e.g. Young Men's Hebrew Association). The German counterpart Jude was extensively used during the Nazi period as a part of its anti-semitic campaign (eventually leading to genocide). The word has become more often used in a neutral fashion, as it underwent a process known as reappropriation. Even today some people are wary of its use, and prefer to use "Jewish". Indeed, when used as an adjective (e.g. "Jew lawyer") or verb (e.g. "to jew someone"), the term Jew is purely pejorative. According to The American Heritage Dictionary of the English Language, Fourth Edition (2000):
It is widely recognized that the attributive use of the noun Jew, in phrases such as Jew lawyer or Jew ethics, is both vulgar and highly offensive. In such contexts Jewish is the only acceptable possibility. Some people, however, have become so wary of this construction that they have extended the stigma to any use of Jew as a noun, a practice that carries risks of its own. In a sentence such as There are now several Jews on the council, which is unobjectionable, the substitution of a circumlocution like Jewish people or persons of Jewish background may in itself cause offense for seeming to imply that Jew has a negative connotation when used as a noun.

References 

 
Etymologies
Ethnonyms
Definitions
English words
Antisemitic slurs
Judaism terminology